Ravil Safiullin (born February 4, 1955, in Makiivka) was Ukraine's Minister of Youth and Sports.

Biography
Ravil Safiullin was born in a Tatar family. Prior to his ministerial position,  Safiullin was the president of Professional Football League of Ukraine in 2000–2008. He is still the Honorary President of PFL Ukraine.

At 23 he finished the medical institute in Donetsk as a doctor-hygienist, epidemiologist. From 1977 to 1993 he worked at medical service. From 1994 to 2000 he worked the vice-president of FC Shakhtar Donetsk. In 2000, he was elected as the president of Professional Football League of Ukraine. Safiullin was people's deputy of IV, V and VI convocations of Verkhovna Rada.

Safiullin is a former Minister of Family, Youth and Sport (in Ukraine).

On 28 February 2013 President Yanukovych reorganized the Ministry of Education and Science, Youth and Sports and the State Service for Youth and Sports, creating a Ministry of Education and the (new) Ministry of Youth and Sports; Safiullin was awarded the ministership of this new institution.

Safiullin did not participate in the 2014 Ukrainian parliamentary election.

In 2020 he became the President of the Ukrainian Athletic Federation. Acting President of the Athletics Federation of Ukraine in January 2023 was Yevhen Pronin.

References

1955 births
Living people
People from Makiivka
Ukrainian people of Tatar descent
Youth and sport ministers of Ukraine
Fourth convocation members of the Verkhovna Rada
Fifth convocation members of the Verkhovna Rada
Sixth convocation members of the Verkhovna Rada
Party of Regions politicians
Ukrainian sports businesspeople
Professional Football League of Ukraine presidents
FC Shakhtar Donetsk non-playing staff